Intezaar is a Pakistani drama film directed by Sakina Samo in her feature film directorial debut based on a script by Bee Gul. Samina Ahmed, Kaif Ghaznavi, Khalid Ahmed, Raza Ali Abid and Adnan Jaffar appear in prominent roles.

The film was first announced in June 2019 during its post-production phase, with music was composed by Darvesh. After delayed theatrical releases, the film released countrywide on 19 August 2022.

Premise 

Intezar revolves around a family and their fears of separation, loneliness and death.

Cast 

 Samina Ahmed as Salma Kanwal
 Kaif Ghaznavi as Ruby
 Khalid Ahmed as Daddy
 Raza Ali Abid as Ali
 Adnan Jaffar as Sameer
 Sakina Samo as Doctor

Production

Pre-production of the film started in early 2019 and the film and its cast was announced by Samo on her social media handle in June 2019, during the post-production phase of the film in Turkey. It marked Samo's feature film directorial debut and her second collaboration with Gul after she directed telefilm, Kaun Qamar Ara which was written by Gul. Owing to creative liberation, the film was made independently without the support of any media partner, as stated by the director. Before its release in theaters, the film was decided to send in international film festivals.

Initially planned to release on 20 March 2020, the theatrical release of the film was postponed due to Covid-19 Pandemic until its gets a new release date of 19 August 2022.

Accolades 

 Harlem International Film Festival - Best Actor - Khalid Ahmed

References

External links